Moose is an unincorporated community in Teton County, Wyoming, in the Jackson Hole valley. It has a US Post Office, with the zip code of 83012. The town is located within Grand Teton National Park along the banks of the Snake River. It is populated mostly by families with inholdings within the borders of the park.

The name Moose can also refer to the small community of Park Service houses located immediately behind administration offices. These houses are exclusively inhabited by Park Service employees and their families. The National Park Service maintains the Grand Teton National Park headquarters in Moose, as well as the park visitor center. A local non-profit, the Grand Teton Association, also maintains some facilities in the area to help further the NPS mission. Olaus and Margaret Murie and Olaus' brother Adolph lived in Moose for much of their lives. Today the Murie Ranch is administered by the Teton Science Schools. The Ranch was designated a National Historic Landmark in 2006.

The residents in Moose are counted as part of the Moose–Wilson Road census-designated place, but most of the residents live on the east side of the Snake River stretching as far south as Jackson Hole Airport, and as far north as Shadow Mountain. Most of the ranches and residences along the Moose–Wilson Road have been turned over to the national park, including John D. Rockefeller, Jr.'s JY Ranch and the Murie Ranch. The commercial area in the community is centered mainly around the shops and restaurants of the Dornan family ranch inholding.

Given its central location in the Jackson Hole valley, Moose has been the setting for several motion pictures, including The Far Horizons in 1955.

Climate

Notable people
Cary Judd, singer, songwriter, author
Olaus Murie, environmentalist, biologist, and former head of the Wilderness Society. Played an instrumental role in the passage of the Wilderness Act and, along with his wife Mardy, in the designation of the Arctic National Wildlife Refuge as a protected area.
Margaret Murie, grandmother of the modern conservation movement, author of several books including Two in the Far North and Wapiti Wilderness. Along with husband Olaus, was instrumental in the designation of the Arctic National Wildlife Refuge as a protected area.
Terry Tempest Williams, American author, conservationist and activist.
Thomas Mangelsen, Wildlife Photographer
Yvon Chouinard, American rock climber, environmentalist, and outdoor industry billionaire businessman. His company, Patagonia, is known for its environmental focus.
Mario Gabelli, American stock investor, investment advisor, and financial analyst. He is the founder, chairman, and CEO of Gabelli Asset Management Company Investors (Gamco Investors), philanthropist.
John F. Turner, former U.S. Fish and Wildlife Service director.

References

Further reading

External links
 Dornans family Ranch

Grand Teton National Park
Unincorporated communities in Teton County, Wyoming
Unincorporated communities in Wyoming